BXN may refer to:
 Bauxite and Northern Railway, a Class III railroad operating in the United States state of Arkansas
 Burduna language of Australia, SIL International language code BXN
 Bodrum-Imsik Airport, Akarca, Turkey, IATA airport code BXN